Academic institutions, including high schools, boarding schools, colleges, and university campuses, have historically been recurring settings for horror films. Film scholars have noted the prominence of educational institutions in the development of horror cinema, particularly in the subgenre of the slasher film. Critics such as Andrew Grunzke have cited the themes of bullying, sexuality, social acceptance, parent-child relationships, academic performance, and the development of morality during teenage and young adult life as primary reasons that many horror films have historically used the backdrop of high schools and colleges. Additionally, the universalization of education during the twentieth century, which coincided with the development of the horror film, helped foster a public audience for films set amongst students.

Colleges and universities

Campuses

Fraternities and sororities

Secondary institutions

Academies

Boarding schools

High schools

See also

Notes

References

Sources

Further reading

Films about school violence
 
Lists of horror films
Lists of films by setting